William Edward McCreary Jr. (born April 15, 1960) is an American former professional ice hockey player who played 12 games in the National Hockey League with the Toronto Maple Leafs during the 1980–81 season. The rest of his career, which lasted from 1980 to 1988, was spent in the minor leagues.

Early life
McCreary Jr. was born in Springfield, Massachusetts, and raised in Hudson, Ohio.

Playing career
Bill McCreary Jr. was drafted in the 6th round, 114th overall, by the Toronto Maple Leafs in the 1979 NHL Entry Draft. He played two seasons of hockey for the Colgate University in the NCAA before signing a contract with the Toronto Maple Leafs in June 1980. He then split the 1980–81 season between the New Brunswick Hawks of the AHL and the Maple Leafs. He played 61 games in the AHL and 12 in the NHL with the Leafs that season. In those twelve games, he scored one goal, had no assists, and added four penalty minutes. That would be the extent of his NHL playing experience as he played out the rest of his career in the CHL, IHL, and AHL. He retired following the 1987–88 IHL season.

Bill McCreary is most remembered for his open ice hit on Wayne Gretzky on January 3, 1981. The myth that McCreary never played another shift in the NHL is false – the January 3 game was McCreary's second game in his 12-game NHL career.

Family 
He is the son of former NHLer Bill McCreary Sr., nephew of former NHLers Keith McCreary and Ron Attwell, and cousin of former NHLer Bob Attwell and NHL referee Bill McCreary. His son, William "Billy" McCreary III, was a minor league hockey player in the Southern Professional Hockey League, Central Hockey League, and Federal Hockey League.

Career statistics

Regular season and playoffs

References

External links
 

1960 births
Living people
American men's ice hockey left wingers
Cincinnati Tigers players
Colgate Raiders men's ice hockey players
Ice hockey players from Massachusetts
Ice hockey players from Ohio
Milwaukee Admirals (IHL) players
New Brunswick Hawks players
People from Hudson, Ohio
Peoria Prancers players
Saginaw Gears players
Sportspeople from Springfield, Massachusetts
St. Catharines Saints players
Toronto Maple Leafs draft picks
Toronto Maple Leafs players